Mohamed Kacemi (born 22 December 1948) represented Algeria in the 1500 m at the 1972 Summer Olympic Games he finished 8th in his heat and failed to advance. He was born in Oum Drou.

References

1948 births
Living people
Algerian male middle-distance runners
Olympic athletes of Algeria
Athletes (track and field) at the 1972 Summer Olympics
People from Chlef Province
21st-century Algerian people
20th-century Algerian people